Eric Telchin (born December 4, 1978) is an American author/artist, best known for his Boy Sees Hearts project, which showcases photographs of naturally occurring heart shapes. His book, See a Heart, Share a Heart was published by Dial Books for Young Readers, a division of Penguin Young Readers Group on December 6, 2012.

Biography 

While hosting a party in 2009, Eric Telchin photographed a heart-shaped puddle of melted ice cream on his kitchen counter. He began capturing more naturally occurring hearts with his iPhone. In 2010, he launched Boy Sees Hearts, a project showcasing the thousands of unaltered heart photos. In December, 2012, Dial Books for Young Readers (an imprint of the Penguin Young Readers Group) published his book, See a Heart, Share a Heart, a 48-page picture book featuring 214 of images from Telchin's collection, paired with loose, interpretive text.

Telchin grew up in Niskayuna, New York and graduated magna cum laude from George Washington University as a Presidential Arts Scholar in 2000.  After graduation, he worked at ABC News as a broadcast designer and for Washingtonpost.com as a Senior Designer.

Telchin currently resides in West Palm Beach, Florida.

Works 

See a Heart, Share a Heart, Dial Books for Young Readers, Penguin, December 6, 2012

Reception 

Artwork consisting of the Boy Sees Hearts photos has been featured on luxury retail web sites such as Aha Life, Vault, and Lisa Kline. In January, 2011, Telchin created a 10'x9' wall of hearts for an episode of ABC's Extreme Makeover: Home Edition.

Publishers Weekly says of See a Heart, Share a Heart that "the subtlety of the images points to the value of being receptive to and perceptive of one's environment."

References

External links 
 Boy Sees Hearts website
 See a Heart, Share a Heart (Penguin site)
 My Valentine for the World (Huffington Post)

American photographers
American male writers
Living people
1978 births